Abay (Abai) is a town (since 1961) located in central Kazakhstan, and has served as the capital of Abay District in Karaganda Region since 2002. Population:  

In 1961, it was renamed Abay, after Abay Qunanbayuli, a Kazakh poet, composer and philosopher.

Sport
In 2014 a team from Abay participated in the national championships in bandy for junior players born in 1996 and younger.

References

Populated places in Karaganda Region
Populated places established in 1949